Stapelia pearsonii is a species of plant in the family Apocynaceae. It is endemic to Namibia.  Its natural habitats are subtropical or tropical dry shrubland and rocky areas.

References

Flora of Namibia
pearsonii
Least concern plants
Taxonomy articles created by Polbot
Taxa named by N. E. Brown